Lucas Damián Molina (30 March 1984 – 28 November 2004) was an Argentine professional footballer who played as a goalkeeper for Independiente.

Career
Born in Buenos Aires, Molina made his professional debut for Independiente in the Argentine Primera División against Vélez Sarsfield on 30 October 2003. He came into the match as a late-substitute for Damián Albil. The match ended 1–0 in favor of Vélez Sarsfield.

International
Molina had played for Argentina at both under-17 and under-20 levels.

Death
On 28 November 2004 Molina died in his sleep from a heart attack. He was taken to the emergency room after his girlfriend noticed his asymmetrical breathing patterns. Despite best efforts, Molina was confirmed dead by 9 am.

References

1984 births
2004 deaths
Footballers from Buenos Aires
Argentine footballers
Argentine Primera División players
Club Atlético Independiente footballers
Association football goalkeepers